Marco Schikora (born 20 September 1994) is a German footballer who plays as a full-back for  side Erzgebirge Aue.

Career
Born in Stadthagen, Schikora played youth football with TSV Havelse before joining Germania Egestorf/Langreder in 2012. After six years at Germania Egestorf/Langreder, he joined Viktoria Berlin in the summer of 2018, and made 32 league appearances, scoring 3 goals, before joining Kickers Offenbach on a one-year contract the following summer. He appeared 19 times in the league for Kickers Offenbach across the 2019–20 season, in which he scored 3 goals before joining 3. Liga side FSV Zwickau in August 2020.

In June 2022, Schikora signed for 3. Liga club Erzgebirge Aue on a two-year deal after leaving Zwickau.

References

External links
 
 

1994 births
Living people
German footballers
People from Stadthagen
Footballers from Lower Saxony
Association football defenders
1. FC Germania Egestorf/Langreder players
FC Viktoria 1889 Berlin players
Kickers Offenbach players
FSV Zwickau players
FC Erzgebirge Aue players
Regionalliga players
3. Liga players
Oberliga (football) players